Damo (fl. c. 500 BC) was a Pythagorean philosopher said by many to have been the daughter of Pythagoras and Theano.

Early life
Tradition relates that she was born in Croton, and was the daughter of Pythagoras and Theano. According to Iamblichus, Damo married Meno the Crotonian. Some accounts refer to her as an only daughter, while others indicate that she had two sisters, Arignote and Myia (married to Milo of Croton). With her brother Telauges, they became members of the Pythagorean sect founded by their father.

Writing 
References to Damo can be found in the works of Diogenes Laërtius, Athenaeus and Iamblichus, although little is known about her life. As the sect credited Pythagoras with authorship for members' work, it is likely that Damo contributed to the doctrines ascribed to the philosopher. According to one story, Pythagoras bequeathed his writings to Damo, and she kept them safe, refusing to sell them, believing that poverty and her father's solemn injunctions were more precious than gold. Damo, in turn, passed the writings (memoranda hypomnemata) on to her daughter Bitale and Telauges, and to her mother's brother. The writings, as well as those by Damo herself, are not known to have survived.  According to Iamblichus, she was a sister of Telauges.

References

Further reading
Coppleston, Frederick, S.J. A History of Philosophy. London: Search Press, 1946.
Guthrie, W.K.C. "Pythagoras and Pythagoreanism," in Encyclopedia of Philosophy. Vol. 7. Edited by Paul Edwards. NY: Macmillan, 1967.
Jamblichus, C. Life of Pythagoras. London: John M. Watkins, 1926.
Kersey, Ethel M. Women Philosophers: a Bio-critical Source Book. CT: Greenwood Press, 1989.
Philip, J.A. Pythagoras and Early Pythagoreanism. Toronto: University of Toronto Press, 1966.
Schure, Edouard. The Ancient Mysteries of Delphi: Pythagoras. NY: Rudolf Steiner, 1971.
Waithe, Mary Ellen, ed. A History of Women Philosophers. Vol. 1. Boston: Martinus Nijhoff, 1987.

6th-century BC Greek people
5th-century BC Greek people
5th-century BC philosophers
Pythagoreans
Presocratic philosophers
Ancient Greek women philosophers
Pythagoreans of Magna Graecia
Ancient Crotonians
6th-century BC births
5th-century BC deaths
6th-century BC Greek women
5th-century BC Greek women